Blake Schoupp is an Australian rugby union player, currently playing for the . His preferred position is prop or hooker.

Early career
Schoupp played junior rugby for Woonoona before studying at Nudgee College. He returned to Sydney, first representing Randwick before joining Southern Districts.

He is the brother of NRL player Aaron Schoupp.

Professional career
His performances in training earned him a start in Round 1 of the 2023 Super Rugby Pacific season where he made his debut against the Waratahs.

References

External links
itsrugby.co.uk Profile

Living people
Australian rugby union players
Rugby union props
Rugby union hookers
ACT Brumbies players